Death and Diamonds is a 1968 German thriller film directed by Harald Reinl and starring George Nader, Carl Möhner, and Heinz Weiss. It was part of the Jerry Cotton series of films about an FBI agent.

It was shot at the Tempelhof Studios in Berlin. The film's sets were designed by the art director Ernst H. Albrecht. Location shooting took place in Los Angeles, Berlin and the Dalmatian coast.

Plot
Jerry Cotton goes undercover to take out a criminal organisation including its bosses. Disguised as a British specialist for alarm systems he joins the gang which has a preference for diamonds. Taking part in their current activities he tries to get to their leaders. Although he works as prudent as he can he arouses suspicion and becomes a target himself.

Cast

References

Bibliography

External links

1968 films
West German films
1960s action thriller films
1960s heist films
1960s spy thriller films
German action thriller films
German sequel films
German spy thriller films
German heist films
1960s German-language films
Films directed by Harald Reinl
Films set in the United States
Films based on crime novels
Films based on German novels
Constantin Film films
Films shot at Tempelhof Studios
1960s German films